Hannah Elizabeth Aspden (born June 11, 2000) is an American Paralympic swimmer. She was the youngest swimmer on Team USA to medal at either the Olympics or Paralympics in 2016. During the 2019–20 season at Queens University of Charlotte, Aspden broke two American Paralympic Short Course Meters Swimming records in both the 100-Meter Backstroke and the 100-Meter Freestyle.

Early life
Aspden was born to mother Jennifer Aspden in Raleigh, North Carolina, without her left leg. She learned to swim at the age of four because she wanted to enter the deep end of the pool at the local YMCA. By the age of 10, she competed in her first swim meet where she met retired Paralympic swimmer Elizabeth Stone. Two years later, Aspden was named to the US Emerging Team roster and became the youngest member on Team USAs National roster at the age of 13.

Aspden attended Quest Academy Charter School for grades 7 and 8 before Leesville High School.

Career
Aspden qualified for Team USAs roster, where she would compete in the S9/SB8/SM9 classifications, in 2014 by a margin of .01 seconds. As a result, she made her national team debut at the 2014 Pan Pacific Swimming Championships and swam a time of 30.47.

Aspden made her Paralympic debut at the 2016 Summer Paralympics, where she became the youngest swimmer on Team USA to medal at either the Olympics or Paralympics in 2016. Aspden earned a bronze medal in the 100-meter backstroke and another third-place finish in the 4x100-meter medley. The following year, she was named to Team USAs 2017 World Championships Team, and committed to attend Queens University of Charlotte.

At the 2018 Pan Pacific Para Swimming Championships, Aspden won a silver medal in the 4x100 medley. The following year, Aspden earned a gold medal at the S9 women's 100 back sweep and 400 freestyle at the 2019 Parapan American Games. During the school year, Aspden competed in six swim meets and broke two American Paralympic Short Course Meters Swimming records for the 100-Meter Backstroke and 100-Meter Freestyle.

On April 14, 2022, Aspden was named to the roster to represent the United States at the 2022 World Para Swimming Championships.

References

External links 
 
 
 

2000 births
Living people
American female backstroke swimmers
American amputees
American disabled sportspeople
Sportspeople with limb difference
Paralympic gold medalists for the United States
Paralympic bronze medalists for the United States
Paralympic swimmers of the United States
Paralympic medalists in swimming
Swimmers at the 2016 Summer Paralympics
Swimmers at the 2020 Summer Paralympics
Medalists at the 2016 Summer Paralympics
Medalists at the 2020 Summer Paralympics
S9-classified Paralympic swimmers
Medalists at the World Para Swimming Championships
Medalists at the 2019 Parapan American Games
Queens Royals
College women's swimmers in the United States
Sportspeople from Raleigh, North Carolina
American female freestyle swimmers
21st-century American women